The 2006 Pattaya Women's Open was a tennis tournament played on hard courts. It was the 15th edition of the PTT Pattaya Open, and was part of the WTA Tier IV tournaments of the 2006 WTA Tour. It was held in Pattaya, Thailand, from 6 to 12 February 2007.

Points and prize money

Point distribution

Prize money

* per team

Singles main draw entrants

Seeds

Other entrants 

The following players received wildcards into the singles main draw:
  Henrieta Nagyová
  Paola Suárez
  Suchanun Viratprasert

The following players received entry from the qualifying draw:
  Kateryna Bondarenko
  Vania King
  Alla Kudryavtseva
  Aleksandra Wozniak

The following player received entry as a lucky loser:
  Anastasia Rodionova

Withdrawals 
  Samantha Stosur (right toe sprain) → replaced by Rodionova

Retirements 
  Paola Suárez (right calf strain)

Doubles main draw entrants

Seeds

Other entrants 
The following pair received wildcards into the doubles main draw:
  Tzipora Obziler /  Napaporn Tongsalee

The following pair received entry from the qualifying draw:
  Catalina Castaño /  Melinda Czink

Finals

Singles

  Shahar Pe'er defeated  Jelena Kostanić, 6–3, 6–1.
It was the 1st singles title of Pe'er in her career.

Doubles

  Li Ting /  Sun Tiantian defeated  Yan Zi /  Zheng Jie, 3–6, 6–1, 7–6(7–5)
It was the 8th title for Li and the 7th title for Sun in their respective doubles careers.

References

External links
 Official Results Archive (ITF)
 Official Results Archive (WTA)

 
 WTA Tour
 in women's tennis
Tennis, WTA Tour, Pattaya Women's Open
Tennis, WTA Tour, Pattaya Women's Open

Tennis, WTA Tour, Pattaya Women's Open